The Cave may refer to:

Literature
"The Cave", a 1943 short story by P. Schuyler Miller
The Cave, a 1959 novel by Robert Penn Warren
The Cave (novel), a 2001 novel by José Saramago
The Cave (play), a 2010 play written by Mervyn Peake in the mid-1950s
Al-Kahf ('The Cave'), the eighteenth sura of the Qur'an

Film
The Cave (2005 film), a thriller film
The Cave (2009 film),  a Canadian short science fiction film,
The Cave (2019 Syrian film), a Syrian-Danish documentary film
The Cave (2019 Thai film), a Thai thriller film

Music
The Cave (opera), a 1994 multimedia opera by Steve Reich
"The Cave" (song), a 2009 song by Mumford & Sons

Other uses
H2 (Canada), a Canadian television channel previously known as The Cave
The Cave (video game), a 2013 video game by Double Fine Productions
The Cave (pub), a student pub at Carleton College

See also
Cave (disambiguation)